The Dimasa people of northeast India have been demanding a separate state called Dimaraji or "Dimaland" for several decades. It would comprise the Dimasa-inhabited areas, namely Dima Hasao district, parts of Cachar district, parts of Nagaon district, Hojai district and Karbi Anglong district in Assam together with part of Dimapur district in Nagaland.

Etymology
The word Dimaraji is derived from Dimasa language and its literal meaning is "Land of the Dimasas".

Aim and objectives
Struggle for existence, safeguard and welfare of the Dimasa community; Serve the students and the community for all round developments in education, literacy, various culture, language and socio-economy etc.; Eradicate social evils –illiteracy, untouchables and other superstitions which are detrimental to the society; Preserve rich ancient heritages – traditional cultures, historical relics, identity etc.; Claim legitimate constitutional rights and privileges for better growth, safeguard and co-existence among others;
 Motto: "Glorify Dimasa".
 Principle: "Live and let live to grow together"

Overview
The Dimasas believe in the existence of a supreme being Madai Under whom there are several Madais including family deities and evil spirits. The religious practices of the Dimasas are reflected in their Daikho system. A Daikho has a presiding deity with a definite territorial jurisdiction and a distinct group of followers known as Khel. Every Dimasa family worships its ancestral deity once a year before sowing the next paddy. It is known as Madai Khelimba, which is done for the general welfare of the family and Misengba is for the good of the whole community. They cremate their dead. The dead body is washed and dressed in new clothes, the corpse is placed inside the house on a mat. A fowl is thrashed to death and placed at the foot of the deceased so that it might show the deceased the right path to heaven. The widow does not tie their hair till cremation. The dead body is cremated by the side of a river or stream.
The Dimasa have a tendency to build their houses on hill slopes with a river or streamlet flowing nearby. The dwelling houses are built on plinth of earth – in two rows facing each other with a sufficiently wide gap in between.

Language

Dimasa language is a language of India ISO 639-3dis. According to 2001 Census  Dimasa language is one of the oldest languages spoken in North East India particularly in Assam. The word Dimasa etymologically translates to "Son of the big river" (Dima-river, sa-sons), the river being the mighty Brahmaputra. The Dimasa word  "Di", meaning water, forms the root of the names of many of the major rivers of Assam and of North East India in general, such as Digrung which means narrow river, Diyung which means huge river, Dikrang, which means green river, Dikhow, which means fetched water, and many others. The mighty river Brahmaputra is known as Dilao (long river) among the Dimasas even now. Many of the important towns and cities in Assam and Nagaland received their names from Dimasa words such as Diphu, Dimapur (a capital of the Dimasa Kingdom), Hojai, Khaspur, etc. In fact, Dimasa language is one of the last languages of the North East India which still has undiluted rich vocabularies. The location of speaking Dimasa language are Assam, Dima Hasao District, Cachar District, Karbi Anglong District, Nagaon District, and other districts of Nagaland, Meghalaya and Mizoram.
Language Maps: India, Map 5
Language Status 5 (Developing).
Classification Sino-Tibetan, Tibeto-Burman, Sal, Bodo-Garo-Northern Naga, Bodo-Koch, Bodo-Garo, Bodo Dialects Dimasa, Hariamba. Related to Kachari [xac].
Language DevelopmentLiteracy rate in L2: 60% in Assam (2001 census).
Dictionary. Grammar. NT: 2005.
Language Resources OLAC resources in and about Dimasa
Writing Bengali and English script. Latin script. A Scheduled Tribe. Some ethnic Dimasa speak other languages as L1: Mikir Karbi [mjw], Bengali [ben], and Assamese [asm].

Dimasa calendar

Names of months

Names of weeks

Road communication of Maibang, Dima Hasao

History of Dimasa people

Rulers or Dimasa kings

Dimapur Capital reign
 Virochana (835–885)
 Vorahi (885–925)
 Prasanto alias Prasadao (Chakradwaj alias Khamaoto)[4] (925–1010)
 Uditya (1010–1040)
 Prabhakar (1040–1070)
 Korpoordhwaj (1070–1100)
 Giridhar (1100–1125)
 Beeradhwaj (1125–1155)
 Surajit (1155–1180)
 Ohak (1180–1210)
 Makardhwaj Narayan (Rana Pratap alias Raogena)[5] (1210–1286)
 Bhopal (1286–1316)
 Purandar (1316–1336)
 Bicharpatipha alias Prakash (1336–1386)
 Vikramadityapha alias Vikaranto (1386–1411)
 Mahamanipha alias Prabal (1411–1436)
 Manipha (1436–1461)
 Ladapha (1461–1486)
 Khunkhora alias Khorapha (1486–1511)
 Det tsang alias Dersongpha (1511–1536)

Maibang capital reign:
 Nirbhay Narayan (1540–1550)
 Durlabh Narayan or Harmesvar (1550–1576)
 Megha Narayana (1576–1583)
 Satrrudaman (Pratap Narayan, Jasa Narayan) (1583–1613)
 Nar Narayan (1613–1625)
 Bhimdarpa Narayan (Bhimbal Konwar (1625–1637)
 Indraballabh Narayan (1637–1655)
 Birdarpa Narayan (1655–1681)
 Garurdhwaj Narayan (1681–1686)
 Makardhwaj (1686–1692)
 Udayaditya (1692–1699)
 Tamradhwaj Narayan (1699–1708)
 Queen Chandraprabha (1708–1710)
 Suradarpa Narayan (1710–1730)
 Dharmadhwaj Narayan (Harischandra Narayan) (1730–1735)
 Kirichandra Narayan (1735–1745)
 Gopichandra Narayan (1745–1757)

Khaspur capital reign:
 Harischandra II (1757–1772)
 Krishnachandra Narayan Hasnusa (1772–1813)
 Gobindchandra Narayan Hasnusa (1813–1830 till of 14 August)
 Tularam Senapaty (Thaosensa)(Died 12 October 1850)

Proposed boundaries of the state
The proposed state's boundaries shall include Dima Hasao, Cachar, parts of Nagaon, Hojai, and Karbi Anglong districts of Assam and part of Dimapur in Nagaland.

According to the Dima Halam Daogah chief Dilip Nunisa, the proposed Dimaraji would comprise three districts: existing Dima Hasao, Garampani district and Borail. Borail would have parts of present Dima Hasao and the tribal dominated areas of Cachar, including the ancient Kachari kingdom capital Khaspur. Garampani would include eastern Dima Hasao and neighbouring Nagaon's Dimasa-dominated Lanka, Hojai, Lumding and Kampur and stretch up to Kachari satra in Dakhinpat under Nagaon sadar police station. Borlangfar, Dhansiri in Karbi Anglong and Dimapur plains should be included in the existing Dima Hasao district.

Tradition
 Ancient Dimasa tradition maintains that sixty thousand moons (Lunar months) ago, they left their ancestral land when it suffered a severe drought. After a long wandering, theysettled at Di-laobra Sangibra, the confluence of the Brahmaputra and Sangi or Di-tsang. There they held a great assembly. The place is the present West Bengal area where the River Ganges and the Brahmaputra join, and where the Kacharis established their first Seat. Over time, their kingdom over large territories. The Dimasa society is divided into 40 ‘Sengphong’ (Male clans) on the basis of male line and 42 ‘Zilik’ on the basis of female line (Female clans) based on totemism and profession. According to traditions, originally, there had been as many as forty ‘Sengphongs’ or clans in the Dimasa society.

Music and Dance
Music and dance play an important role in the day-to-day life of the Dimasa society. They sing and dance, expressing their joy at the youth common houses ‘Nadrang’ or at the courtyard of the ‘Gajaibaou's house in popular common festival like Bushu or Hangsao – manauba. The female owner of the house, where the Bushu festival is held, is called ‘Gajaibaou’. 
By using their traditional musical instruments like Muri, Muri-wathisa, Supin Khram, Khramdubung, they present their traditional dances named – Baidima, Jaubani, Jaupinbani, Rennginbani, Baichargi, Kunlubani, Daislelaibani, Kamauthaikim Kaubani, Nanabairibani, Baururnjla, Kailaibani, Homaudaobani, Rongjaobani, Dausipamaikabani, Daudngjang, Nowaijang, Dailaibani, Narimbani, Rogidaw bihimaiyadaw, Maijaobani, Maisubanai, Richibbani, Michai bonthai jibnai, Homojing ladaibani, Berma charao paibani, Mangusha bondaibani, Madaikalimbani.
The Dimasa males put on the traditional dresses like richa, rikaosa, paguri rimchau and rimchaoramai to perform the folk dances. The females put on Rigu, rijamfini, rijamfinaberen, rikaucha, rikhra, jingsudu etc.and wear ornaments like Kaudima, Khadu, Kamautai, Longbar, Panlaubar. Chandraral, Rongbarcha, Enggrasa, Jongsama, Ligjao, Jingbri, Yausidam etc.
The dance forms of the Dimasa people are complex in character. They are strictly dependent on instrumental music. No songs are used. Khram (drum) follows the rhythm of the Muri (fife) and so also the dancers. Though one may find the music trilling from Muri to be monotonous, but there are variations with noticeable microtones for different dance forms. That is why young men practice dancing at Nadrang during leisure hours and the village kids follow the rhythm and stepping at a distance from an early age.

Dimasa Holybath at Panimur (Dikhoro Digalai)
 Dimasani Thirtha Majang (Khaha gasain Maithani)

To revive the Grand Holy Bath of Dimasa at Dikhro Dighai  K C Bodo took pioneering initiatives and  also constituted an organization "Kapili Tirtha Samsaj’ in 1984.    It came to his notice that Grand holy bath at Dikhoro Dihalai was circumscribed only among the single Julu Marongma Daogua and a single Sengphong Senkring Rajiyung.  He set the rolling ball to collect various historical accounts and material evidences from various sources. Consequently, he also compiled a book  "Kapili Thirtha" by name. The book endowed profusely with many facts and his findings about Kapili Thirtha is very helpful to understand the rich heritage of Dimasa's faith and beliefs.  According to K C Bodo, Dimasa King, Damrodos of Maibang was the last king who  visited this holy shrine  with their large peoppe gathering here. There was a very elaborate history about the Grand Holy bath of Dimasa King Danrodos.  But after his demise, no such grand holy bath was recorded.  It may be due  to various turmoil appeared in Dimasa Kingdom in later period and with advent of British finally the sunset of Dimajaji took place.

With profound realization of the importance of this Grand Holy Bath, he approached many Dimasa Intelligentsia and social workers  to revive and to make it as grand holy bath of Dimasa.

In 1987 P K Kemprai (CEM), KK Hojai, Hambang Bathari and many others people  assembled at Panimur to view the holy Bath taken by Marongma daogua  and they also took bath. In the  open meeting all assembled people resolved to make it as  Grand Holy Bath of Dimasa People so that irrespective of all sephong, Julu will take bath together in the same wari (waterfall).  Every Dimasa feel the need of common platform to stand united spiritually, religiously and culturally  on the pedestal of true fraternity  and amity to revive the Dimasa Nationalition.  Our people have been shattered into pieces geographically, economically and even religiously with blind acceptance of other cultures and tratiotions. There was saying " It was the crucial time for us to take the  esteem responsibilities of our nation building".     So the  great sons of Dimasa such as Panidra Gorlosa, Hambang Bathari, K K Hojai, Kumbo Hojai, Naren Daolaguphu  Nirupoma Hagjer, Ramendra Lanthasa, and many other came forward to organize  this grand holy Bath. Finally, Dimasa Dara Disani Dol along with Kapili Tirtha Samaj  organized   the first  Grand Holy Bath on 9 February 1990   which come out with splendid people gatherings.

[Many of the persons who did a lot for the holy bath are not mentioned in it pertaining to its abridged  form]

Festivals

 Busu Dima (The joyous harvesting festival)

Among the festivals of the Dimasas, Busu Dima is the biggest and the most important community festival. It is usually celebrated in January of every year. According to the Dimasa Calendar, 27 January is marked as Busu Dima. The Dimasa people of Dima Hasao District, Cachar District, Hojai, Karbi Anglong District of Assam and Dimapur District of Nagaland, being farming people, celebrate various agricultural festivals in different ways and at different times. Mostly Dimasa inhabiting Dima Hasao district and Karbi Anglong district are successful in preserving their age old traditional religious beliefs and practices in and through the celebration of several festivals, with some exceptions, due to being Hinduised. The Dimasa festival can be categorized into community festivals and local festivals.
The local festivals are performed by each village separately, and participation is restricted to the people of the village concerned. The community festivals are Misengba and Busu, while local festivals are Khorongfang Gerba, Maisalai Gerba, Rajini Gerba, Hor-ni Gerba etc.

The grand Busu festival may be divided into three categories:
 Busu Jidap – When the Busu is celebrated for three days, it is called Jidap•
 Surem Baino : If it is observed for five days, it is called Surem Baino•
 Hangseu Manaoba : When it is observed for seven days it is called Hangseu Manaoba•
In all festivities they used to make a "heih-ho" (Haoba) as to mark the grand festivities and ceremony.

Geographical features

Hills
 The  major portion of the area is covered by hills. The main range is Borail of which "Thumjang" is the highest peak at 1866meters & Hempeupet is the 2nd highest peak at 1748 meters. The other main range is Khartheng range from Dittokcherra to Garampani.

Rivers
 The main rivers are Kapili, Dehangi, Diyung, Jatinga, Jenam, Mahur, Langting, etc.. Of these Diyung (which means Large Water in Dimasa language) River is the longest, having a length of 240 km. Almost all rivers originate from Borail.

Climate
 Rainfall is heavy during the months from May to September, but it is not evenly distributed throughout the district/state. Climate condition is also not uniform. Rainfall in Borail range is heaviest. Annual average in this range varies from 2200mm to 2700mm while in the Langting - Manderdisa - Diyungmukh area it receives much less rain( i.e., from 1200 mm. to 1800 mm.). The average mean maximum temperature varies from 24 °C to 30 °C. The average mean minimum temperature varies from 10 °C to 14 °C. The average relative humidity varies from73% to 84%.

Forest and its area
 The areas covered by forest in the District@State is as shown below:

Forest species and produces
 Important tree plants naturally available are Haldu, Gamari, Titachopa, Nahar, Bonsum, Bogipoma, Bola, Koroi, Bhelu, Makri, Sal etc. Minor Forest Produces available are Bamboo, Cane, Broom sticks, Tezpat, Dalchini, Tannins, Medicinal plants and herbs, Honey, Sand, Gravels etc.

Wild life
 Tiger, Leopard, Elephant, Barking Deer, Screw Hollock, Gibbons, Black Bear, Wild dog, Wild Buffalo, Mithun etc. are the main inhabitants of the hill ecosystem. The varieties of birds, snakes, tortoise and other reptiles, etc. too, enrich the hills biodiversities.

Minerals
 Limestone and coal in small quantity are found in the neighbourhood of Garampani. Carbonaceous shale is available in Baga area. Good quality of limestone low in magnesea & suitable for cement manufacturing is also available.

Dimaraji movement

Underground
 The Dima Halam Daoga  (DHD) is a descendant of the Dimasa National Security Force (DNSF), which ceased operations in 1995. Commander-in-Chief Jewel Gorlosa, refused to surrender and launched the Dima Halam Daogah. After the peace agreement between the DHD and the central government in the year 2003, the group further broke out and  DHD(J) also known as Black Widow was born which was led by Jewel Gorlosa. The Black Widow's declared objective is to create Dimaraji for the Dimasa people in Dima Hasao district only. However The objective of DHD (Nunisa faction) is to include parts of Cachar, Karbi Anglong, and Nagaon districts in Assam, and sections of Dimapur district in Nagaland.

ADSU
 The All Dimasa Students’ Union (ADSU) apart from safeguarding the common interest of the Dimasa community as a whole launched a democratic political movement on 30 April 2003 staging a demonstration at Jantar Mantar, New Delhi demanding Dimaraji. The major grievances of the All Dimasa Students’ Union (ADSU): Today, the very existence of the Dimasa People, nay, the aboriginal tribe of the North Eastern States is at stake irrespective of places of their original traditional habitats since the time immemorial in the region. Evenafter 60 years of Indian Independence, there is no trace of least development or change of Dimasa people in any aspect, and on the other hand, numerous problems are cropped up and added to one after another every day.
Till today, our people are almost backward, neglected, deprived of all legitimate constitutional benefits, and compelled to remain in despair and resentment. The rapid development of other higher and more intellectual sections of the society causes our people ‘surprised’. After careful observations of these grievous situations of our people the ADSU held the Government and its administrative policies RESPONSIBLE.

Industries

NEEPCO - Kopili Hydro Electric Project
A government of India enterprise, located in the Dima Hasao district near the Assam-Meghalaya border, the hot spring of Garampani is now lost in the dammed water of Kopili river after completion of Kopili Hydro Electric Project. 
The Kopili Hydro Electric Project was the maiden venture of NEEPCO when it came into existence in 1976.

Khandong and Kopili Power Station
The first stage of Kopili Hydro Electric Plant has two dam and dyke systems which created two reservoirs, one on the Kopili River and the other on the Umrang stream, a tributary of the Kopili. Water from the Kopili reservoir is used in the Khandong power station through a 2759-metre tunnel to generate 50 MW (2 × 25 MW) of power. The tail water from this powerhouse is led to the Umrong reservoir. The water from Umrong reservoir is taken through a 5473-metre tunnel to the Kopili power station to generate 100 MW (2 × 50 MW) of power.

The first stage extension of the plant envisaged setting up two additional 50 MW units at Kopili power station, provisions for which were already kept during the first stage development of the project. The Units III and IV under this extension scheme were commissioned in March 1997 and June 1997 respectively. The total installed capacity of the Kopili power station thus went up to 200 MW and that of the project as whole to 250 MW. The Umrong reservoir was raised by 7.6 m to meet the demand for more water for two additional 50 MW units of first stage extension.

KHEP Stage II power station
The second stage of the Kopili Hydro Electric Plant involves a powerhouse to generate additional 25 MW of power by using water from the Khandong reservoir through a 481 metre long water conductor system, provision of which was kept as a bypass conduit from the surge shaft in the Khandong tunnel. The water from the second stage powerhouse will go to the Umrong reservoir for use in the Kopili power station.

Cement industries
Vinay Cements was set up in 1989 at a capital cost of Rs. 270 million. At the time of commissioning, it was one of the largest private sector investments in the north east region. The plant uses rotary technology with a four-stage pre-heater and forth generation grate cooler. It has an installed capacity of 0.24 million tons per annum. In its market, it has consistently been among the top three manufacturers of cement since inception. In 2004 it became a 100% debt-free company. In 2006–2007 it has reported revenues of 488 million and an EBIDTA of Rs. 117 million. With a view to consolidate the group companies and provide greater shareholder value, it has recently initiated the process of acquiring RCL Cement in an all-stock deal. There are three  other cement industries in the vicinity of the town, NECEM CEMENTS LIMITED ( 1989), RCL (1999), Calcom (2007) & SCL. Residents in the area claim that the presence of these cement factories has led to chronic air pollution.

Organizations and NGOs
 Dimasa Sahitya Sabha (DSS)
 Dimasa Sanskritik Parishad (DSP)
 Dimasa Social Welfare Organization (DSWO)
 Dimasa Women Society (DWS)
 Dima Hasao Sports Association (DHSA)
 Hills State Democratic Party (HSDP)
 HSDP Mahila Sangathan (HSDPMS)
All Dimasa Students’ Union, Maibang
All Dimasa Students' Union, Diyungbra
All Dimasa Students’ Union, Haflong
All Dimasa Students’ Union, Silchar
All Dimasa Students’ Union, Diphu
All Dimasa Students’ Union, Dimapur
All Dimasa Students’ Union, Guwahati
 All Dimasa Students Union, Delhi
Kapili Tirtha Samaj, Panimur
Sibrai Bosong, Lanka

Dimasa Lairimin Haba
   
 A literary organization envisaged to revive and upgrade the Dimasa language. This organization was founded by  legendary Dimasa soci-religious activist and  Dimasa Sahithya Sabha laureate late K C Bodo in 1994. As an author the late K C Bodo tackled the problem of finding a publisher of books written in Dimasa, which is still a prevailing problem among the Dimasa writers.  Realizing the gravity of the problems, he instituted this organization with consultations of personalities such as K K Hojai, P Gorlosa and H Bathari. Thus in 1997 K k Hojai on behalf of this institution published "Thairili"  a collection of Dimasa poems written  K C Bodo. K C Bodo looked forward to create a large financial corpus to facilitate publications of Dimasa books thereby encouraging those authors who were contributing to the development of the Dimasa language. But he devotes his time much more on religious preaching of Horaolim in later part of his life. Religious reformations crusading prevailing superstitious belief and practice   and spreading educations in our society are  the destiny in his life. His writing not only reflect his genuine talent but also versatility. Some of the books published by Dimasa Lairimin Habaare
 "Thairili"  (1997)  written in Dimasa by Mungridao, a pseudonym  
 "Sainyader" (1996) written in Dimasa by Mungridao, a pseudonym

Tourism attractions

MAIBANG: Located on the bank of the river Mahur and 53km from Haflong. Maibang once flourished as the capital of Dimasa, kachari Kingdom. Stone house, temple of Kachari king and other ruins of the kingdom are the main attractions of the place.

 
HAFLONG: Up in the rugged terrains stands Assam's only hill station Haflong. It is the headquarters of Dima Hasao District. 

 UMRANGSO: 224 km from Guwahati, Assam. The huge Hydel plant has come up under North East electric Power Corporation (NEEPCO) with dams in the Kopili river. Near Umrangso, there is aHot spring( GARAMPANI), the water of which is believed to have medicinal value.

JATINGA: World-famous for bird mystery (Birds Harakiri). The migratory birds come during the months August to November and it becomes the ornithologist's attraction. From the elevated watch tower one can see them yielding to their death wish and their little plumage dropping down.

PANIMOOR: The Kopili River turns into a thrilling waterfall, rolling over the rocks of Panimoor.

See also
 Dimasa
 Dimasa language
 Dimasa Kingdom
 Maibang
 Dima Hasao District
 Dimapur
 Busu Dima

References

Regions of India
Geography of India
Dima Hasao district